This is a list of curling clubs in the Canadian province of British Columbia. Curling in British Columbia is organized by the Curl BC. Curl BC divides the province into 11 regions:

Region 1 (West Kootenay)
Beaver Valley Curling Club - Fruitvale
Castlegar Curling Club - Castlegar
Grand Forks Curling Club - Grand Forks
Nelson Curling Centre - Nelson
Riondel Curling Club - Riondel
Salmo Valley Curling Club - Salmo
Trail Curling Centre - Trail

Region 2 (East Kootenay)
Cranbrook Curling Club - Cranbrook
Creston Curling Club - Creston
Elkford Curling Club - Elkford
Fernie Curling Club - Fernie
Golden Curling Club - Golden
Invermere Curling Club - Invermere
Kimberley Curling Club - Kimberley
Sparwood Curling Club - Sparwood

Region 3 (South Okanagan)
Kelowna Curling Club - Kelowna
Oliver Curling Club - Oliver
Osoyoos International Curling Club - Osoyoos
Penticton Curling Club - Penticton
Princeton Curling Centre - Princeton
Summerland Curling Club - Summerland
Winfield Curling Club - Winfield

Region 4 (North Okanagan/Shuswap)
Armstrong Curling Club - Armstrong
Enderby & District Curling Club - Enderby
Lumby Curling Club - Lumby
Revelstoke Curling Club - Revelstoke
Salmon Arm Curling Club - Salmon Arm
Vernon Curling Club - Vernon

Region 5 (Cariboo/Prince George)
100 Mile House Curling Club - 100 Mile House
Curl Mackenzie - Mackenzie
Fraser Lake Curling Club - Fraser Lake
Prince George Golf & Curling Club - Prince George
Quesnel Curling Club - Quesnel
Wells Curling Club - Wells
Williams Lake Curling Club - Williams Lake

Region 6 (Northwest)
Hirsch Creek Curling Club - Kitimat
Houston and District Curling Club - Houston
Prince Rupert Curling Club - Prince Rupert
Smithers Curling Club - Smithers
Terrace Curling Club - Terrace

Region 7 (Thompson)
Ashcroft Curling Club - Ashcroft
Barriere Curling Club - Barriere
Chase Curling Club - Chase
Kamloops Curling Club - Kamloops
Lillooet Curling Club - Lillooet
McArthur Island Curling Club- Kamloops
Merritt Curling Centre - Merritt
Wells Gray Curling Club - Clearwater

Region 8 (South Island)
Esquimalt Curling Club - Esquimalt
Glen Meadows Golf & Country Club - North Saanich
Victoria Curling Centre - Victoria

Region 9 (Mid Island)
Alberni Valley Curling Club - Port Alberni
Cowichan Rocks Club - Lake Cowichan
Duncan Curling Club - Duncan
Kerry Park Curling Club - Mill Bay
Nanaimo Curling Centre - Nanaimo
Parksville Curling Club - Parksville
Qualicum & District Curling Club - Qualicum Beach

Region 10 (North Island)
Campbell River Curling Club - Campbell River
Comox Valley Curling Club - Courtenay
Fort Rupert Curling Club - Port Hardy
Port Alice Curling Club - Port Alice
Powell River Curling Club - Powell River

Region 11 (Lower Mainland/Fraser Valley)
Abbotsford Curling Club - Abbotsford
Arbutus Curling Club - Vancouver
Chilliwack Curling Club - Chilliwack
Cloverdale Curling Club - Cloverdale
Coquitlam Curling Club - Coquitlam
Delta Thistle Curling Club - Delta
Gibsons Curling Club - Gibsons
Golden Ears Winter Club - Maple Ridge
Hollyburn Country Club - West Vancouver
Hope Curling Club - Hope
Howe Sound Curling Club - Squamish
Langley Curling Club - Langley
Marpole Curling Club - Vancouver
Mission Granite Curling Club - Mission
Peace Arch Curling Centre - White Rock
Port Moody Curling Club - Port Moody
Richmond Curling Club - Richmond
Royal City Curling Club - New Westminster
Tunnel Town Curling Club - Tsawwassen
Vancouver Curling Club - Vancouver

Peace Curling Association
The PCA is organized under the Alberta Curling Federation, but has a few clubs in B.C.

Bullhead Mountain Curling Club - Hudson's Hope
Chetwynd Curling Club - Chetwynd
Dawson Creek Curling Club - Dawson Creek
Fort Nelson Curling Club - Fort Nelson
Fort St. John Curling Club - Fort St. John
Taylor Curling Club - Taylor
Tumbler Ridge Curling Club - Tumbler Ridge

External links
Curl BC Curling Centre directory 
Peace Curling Association club listing

 British Columbia
Curling clubs
Curling
 
Curling in British Columbia
British Columbia